The grey-breasted mountain toucan (Andigena hypoglauca) is a Near Threatened species of bird in the toucan family Ramphastidae. It is found in Colombia, Ecuador and Peru.

Taxonomy and systematics

The grey-breasted mountain toucan was originally described in the genus Pteroglossus. Two subspecies are recognized, the nominate A. h. hypoglauca (Gould, 1833) and A. h. lateralis (Chapman, 1923).

Description

Males and females within each subspecies have the same plumage, and the two subspecies have the same bill pattern though the female's bill is shorter. The bill's base is yellow to greenish with a black band near the base. The maxilla's outer 2/3 is red, meeting the yellow diagonally. The mandible's outer half is black. Both subspecies have a black cap, face, and nape; a gray-blue band on the hindneck; a greenish brown back; and gray to gray-blue underparts. Their tail is blackish with chestnut tips on the two or three central pairs of feathers. The nominate subspecies has a bright yellow rump, pale gray-blue flanks, chestnut thighs, and red undertail coverts. Its eye is brown and surrounded by bare blue skin. Subspecies A. h. lateralis has a paler yellow rump than the nominate, pale yellow to gray-white flanks, and a yellow to green eye.

Distribution and habitat

The nominate subspecies of grey-breasted mountain toucan is found from central and southern Colombia into eastern Ecuador. A. h. lateralis is found from eastern Ecuador south well into Peru. The species inhabits wet temperate montane forest including cloud, elfin, and secondary forest.

Behavior

Movement

The grey-breasted mountain toucan is not known to have a pattern of movement.

Feeding

The grey-breasted mountain toucan forages from near the ground up to the forest's canopy, singly, in pairs, or in small groups that might be extended families. It sometimes joins mixed-species foraging flocks. Its diet is known to include fruit and berries and is assumed to also include some vertebrates.

Breeding

The grey-breasted mountain toucan's breeding season spans from December to February in Colombia and from June or July to November in Ecuador and Peru. Nothing else is known about its breeding biology.

Vocal and non-vocal sounds

The grey-breasted mountain toucan's song is a "low 'gweeeeeeeat'". Its calls include "wek" notes made singly or in a series, and "kek" notes in alarm or aggression. Songs and calls can include "bill-whacking".

Status

The IUCN has assessed the grey-breasted mountain toucan as Near Threatened. Its population size is not known and is believed to be decreasing. The principal threat is deforestation from expanding agriculture, mining, and logging. Though it occurs in some protected areas and is thought to be locally common, "[p]opulation fragmentation and inbreeding are possible problems".

References

grey-breasted mountain toucan
Birds of the Northern Andes
grey-breasted mountain toucan
Taxonomy articles created by Polbot